Vezet is a former commune in the Haute-Saône department in the region of Bourgogne-Franche-Comté in eastern France. On 1 January 2016, it was merged into the new commune La Romaine.

See also
Communes of the Haute-Saône department

References

Former communes of Haute-Saône
Populated places disestablished in 2016